Ball's Green is a hamlet in Gloucestershire, England.

External links
StreetMap.co.uk

Hamlets in Gloucestershire